The thali is a percussion instrument of the family of idiophones used in Indian folk music. It is a round, flat metal platter used in cuisine that is beaten with a stick if it is held with the other hand, or beaten with two sticks if it is placed on the floor or on a stand. The thali frequently accompanies the dhol or maddal drum in various dances.

References
Garland Encyclopedia of World Music (Book 5). Routledge; Har/Com edition (November 1999).

External links
Dhol and thali video
Photo
Photos

Idiophones
Indian musical instruments